Parsons and Naylor's Pull-Out Sections was a BBC Radio 2 satirical comedy show starring Andy Parsons and Henry Naylor. It also stars Richie Webb, and one female "special guest".

Female guests included Lucy Porter, Jo Caulfield, Julia Morris, Sarah Kendall, Kitty Flanagan, Nina Conti, Geraldine McNulty and Nina Wadia.

Most shows were recorded at The Drill Hall in London, although some were recorded at the Pleasance during the Edinburgh Festival Fringe. Some of series eight and one show of series nine was recorded at the University of London Union on Malet Street.

Production for the show started on Tuesdays, when the commissioned would meet at Broadcasting House at Portland Place. The show also had an open door policy, allowing non-commissioned writers to submit unsolicited scripts. On recording days, a variety of sketches would be tested in front of the audience and developed for later inclusion in the programme.

A 'best of' compilation album was released in August 2003, and shows were often repeated on BBC7.

Transmission dates and special guests
This table lists the dates of the original Thursday evening BBC Radio 2 transmissions, along with the special guests.

There were also New Year Specials on 3 January 2002 and  27 December 2002, and a Christmas special on 25 December 2003.

:  Recorded at the Pleasance Theatre during the Edinburgh Fringe.
:  Recorded at the University of London Union (Malet Street, London. WC1).
:  Not broadcast on the Thursday due to Comic Relief, but was broadcast on the Saturday repeat.

Subjects
Each show is introduced with a short hit on the co-star and 'musical maestro' Richie Webb.

The main subjects would include;
News
Society
Lifestyle
Culture
Travel
Music
Media
Sport
Bigotry
FootballHome Affairs
Bank Holidays
Living
Christmas
Education
Animals
Hollywood
News Review
Classified
Fashion

CD track listing

CD one
Introduction
News    Imagine a world - live in the Middle East
Bigotry
Football
Culture    In a nutshell - Shakespear Play
Home Affairs
Society
Bank Holidays    In a nutshell - Interview with a Royal nutter
Music
Lifestyle
Introduction
News
Media
Living
Christmas
Education
Sport
Music
Animals

CD two
Introduction
News
Society
Travel
Sport
Lifestyle
Culture
Music
News Review
Introduction
News
Society
Travel
Culture
Sport
Hollywood
Lifestyle
Music
Top 20
News Review

References

External links

BBC Writer's Room
Doubled up: Parsons and Naylor's comedy careers 2003 interview
BBC Writers Room

BBC Radio comedy programmes
2001 radio programme debuts
BBC Radio 2 programmes